Agia Paraskevi is a former municipality in Kozani regional unit, West Macedonia, Greece. Since the 2011 local government reform, it is part of the municipality Eordaia, of which it is a municipal unit. The municipal unit has an area of 119.606 km2. The population in 2011 was 1,352. The seat of the municipality was in Agios Christoforos.

References

Former municipalities in Western Macedonia
Populated places in Kozani (regional unit)

bg:Света Петка (дем)